The Big Animal is a 2000 Polish film directed by Jerzy Stuhr from a screenplay by Krzysztof Kieślowski, based on a short story Wielbłąd (1995) by Kazimierz Orłoś.

Plot
Mr. Zygmunt Sawicki is a bank employee, who finds a camel in his yard one day. He decides to take charge of it and he and his wife Marysia take care of it. However, problems arise for both his fellow town-dwellers and the local authorities.

Cast
 Jerzy Stuhr as Zygmunt Sawicki
 Anna Dymna as Marysia Sawicka
 Andrzej Franczyk as Bank Manager
 Dominika Bednarczyk as Bank Clerk 1
 Błażej Wójcik as Bank Clerk 2
 Stanisław Banaś as Fire Chief
 Krzysztof Gluchowski as Mayor
 Feliks Szajnert as Drunkard

Production
The film was shot in the following locations: Warsaw, Tymbark, Myślenice, Rabka.

Awards
On 8 July 2000, the film was first released at the 35th Karlovy Vary International Film Festival, where it won the Special Jury Prize, in tie with Peppermint Candy.

Home media
After distributing 35mm prints to theaters, Milestone Films released the film on DVD in 2003.

Festivals
 AFI Fest 2000: The American Film Institute Los Angeles International Film Festival (International Competition) October 19–26, 2000.
 Karlovy Vary International Film Festival (in competition) July 5–15, 2000.
 London Film Festival (Cinema Europa) November 1–16, 2000.
 San Francisco International Film Festival April 19 - May 3, 2001.
 Sydney Film Festival June 8–22, 2001.

References

External links
 
 
Big Animal at Milestone Films

2000 films
Polish drama films
2000s Polish-language films
Films about camels
Films shot in Poland
Films with screenplays by Krzysztof Kieślowski